David Trinidad (born 1953 in Los Angeles, California) is an American poet.

David Trinidad was born in Los Angeles, California, and raised in the San Fernando Valley. He attended California State University, Northridge, where he studied poetry with Ann Stanford and edited the literary journal Angel’s Flight. While at Northridge, he became friends with the poet Rachel Sherwood, a fellow student. On July 5, 1979, Sherwood and Trinidad were involved in an automobile accident in which Sherwood was killed and Trinidad severely injured. Later, Trinidad published a book of Rachel Sherwood's poems and established Sherwood Press in her honor.

Trinidad’s first book of poems, Pavane, was published in 1981. The Los Angeles Times Book Review noted that Trinidad’s "voice has assurance and integrity.” In the early 1980s, Trinidad was one of a group of poets who were active at the Beyond Baroque Literary Arts Center in Venice, California. Other members of this group included Dennis Cooper, Bob Flanagan, Amy Gerstler, Jack Skelley, and Ed Smith. As editor of Sherwood Press, he published books by Cooper, Flanagan, Gerstler, Tim Dlugos, Alice Notley, and others. In 1988, Trinidad relocated to New York City. He received his Master of Fine Arts from Brooklyn College in 1990. He taught at Rutgers University and The New School. In 2002, Trinidad moved to Chicago to teach at Columbia College, where he co-founded the literary journal Court Green. His personal papers are archived at Fales Library at New York University.

In addition to his own books, Trinidad has edited several volumes of poetry, including A Fast Life: The Collected Poems of Tim Dlugos (2011), which won a Lambda Literary Award. His latest edited volume, Punk Rock Is Cool for the End of the World: Poems and Notebooks of Ed Smith, was published in June 2019.

Trinidad is known for his masterful use of popular culture in his poems. The poet James Schuyler wrote, “Trinidad turns the paste jewels of pop art into the real thing.” His work is also associated with the innovative formalism of the New York School. Alice Notley has written, “There is an unwavering light in all of Trinidad’s work that turns individual words into objects, new facts.” About The Late Show (2007), The New York Times Book Review wrote that Trinidad’s “most impressive gift is an ability to dignify the dross of American life, to honor both the shrink-wrapped sentiment of the cultural artifacts he writes about and his own much more complicated emotional response to them.”

Published works
Pavane (1981)
Monday, Monday (1985)
Living Doll (1986)
November (1987)
Three Stories (1988)
Hand Over Heart: Poems 1981-1988 (1991)
Answer Song (1994)
Essay with Movable Parts (1998)
Plasticville (2000)
Tiny Moon Notebook (2007)
The Late Show (2007)
Dear Prudence: New and Selected Poems (2011)
Peyton Place: A Haiku Soap Opera (2013)
Notes on a Past Life (2016)
Swinging on a Star (2017)
Coteries and Gossip: Naropa Diary, June 13–20, 2010 (2019)
Digging to Wonderland: Memory Pieces (2022)

Collaborations
A Taste of Honey (with Bob Flanagan, 1990)
Chain Chain Chain (with Jeffery Conway and Lynn Crosbie, 2000)
Phoebe 2002: An Essay in Verse (with Jeffery Conway and Lynn Crosbie, 2003)
By Myself: An Autobiography (with D. A. Powell, 2009)
Descent of the Dolls, Part I (with Jeffery Conway and Gillian McCain, 2017)

Editor
Powerless: Selected Poems 1973-1990 by Tim Dlugos (1996)
Holding Our Own: The Selected Poems of Ann Stanford (with Maxine Scates, 2001)
Saints of Hysteria: A Half-Century of Collaborative American Poetry (with Denise Duhamel and Maureen Seaton, 2007)
A Fast Life: The Collected Poems of Tim Dlugos (2011)
Punk Rock Is Cool for the End of the World: Poems and Notebooks of Ed Smith (2019)
Divining Poets: Dickinson (Emily Dickinson divination deck, 2019)
New York Diary by Tim Dlugos (2021)

Essays, studies
Hidden in Plain Sight: On Sylvia Plath's Missing Journals (2010)
So Much Depends: On the Particular, the Personal, & the Political (2017)

External links
The Fales Library Guide to the David Trinidad Papers
The Late Show review from the New York Times

1953 births
Living people
American male poets
Columbia College Chicago faculty
Outlaw poets
Lambda Literary Award winners
Writers from Los Angeles
American gay writers
American LGBT poets
New York School poets
Brooklyn College alumni
Gay poets